Microbacteriaceae is a family of bacteria of the order Actinomycetales. They are Gram-positive soil organisms.

Genera
The family Microbacteriaceae comprises the following genera:

 Agreia Evtushenko et al. 2001
 Agrococcus Groth et al. 1996
 Agromyces Gledhill and Casida 1969 (Approved Lists 1980)
 Allohumibacter Kim et al. 2016
 Alpinimonas Schumann et al. 2012
 Amnibacterium Kim and Lee 2011
 Arenivirga Hamada et al. 2017
 Aurantimicrobium Nakai et al. 2015

 Canibacter Aravena-Román et al. 2014

 Clavibacter Davis et al. 1984
 Cnuibacter Zhou et al. 2016
 Compostimonas Kim et al. 2012
 Conyzicola Kim et al. 2014
 "Crocebacterium" Rogers & Doran-Peterson 2006
 Cryobacterium Suzuki et al. 1997
 "Cryocola" Gavrish et al. 2003
 Curtobacterium Yamada and Komagata 1972 (Approved Lists 1980)
 Diaminobutyricibacter Kim et al. 2014
 Diaminobutyricimonas Jang et al. 2013
 Frigoribacterium Kämpfer et al. 2000

 Frondihabitans Greene et al. 2009
 Galbitalea Kim et al. 2014
 Glaciibacter Katayama et al. 2009
 Glaciihabitans Li et al. 2014
 Gryllotalpicola Kim et al. 2012
 Gulosibacter Manaia et al. 2004
 Herbiconiux Behrendt et al. 2011
 Homoserinibacter Kim et al. 2014
 Homoserinimonas Kim et al. 2012
 Huakuichenia Zhang et al. 2016
 Humibacter Vaz-Moreira et al. 2008
 Klugiella Cook et al. 2008
 Labedella Lee 2007
 Lacisediminihabitans Zhuo et al. 2020
 Leifsonia Evtushenko et al. 2000
 Leucobacter Takeuchi et al. 1996
 "Luethyella" O'Neal et al. 2017
 

 Lysinibacter Tuo et al. 2015
 Lysinimonas Jang et al. 2013
 "Marinisubtilis" Qin et al. 2021
 Marisediminicola Li et al. 2010
 Microbacterium Orla-Jensen 1919 (Approved Lists 1980)
 Microcella Tiago et al. 2005
 Microterricola Matsumoto et al. 2008
 Mycetocola Tsukamoto et al. 2001
 Naasia Weon et al. 2013
 Okibacterium Evtushenko et al. 2002
 Parafrigoribacterium Kong et al. 2016

 Planctomonas Liu et al. 2019
 "Candidatus Planktoluna" Hahn 2009
 Plantibacter Behrendt et al. 2002
 Pontimonas Jang et al. 2013
 Protaetiibacter Heo et al. 2019 
 Pseudoclavibacter Manaia et al. 2004
 Pseudolysinimonas Heo et al. 2019
 Puzihella Sheu et al. 2017
 Rathayibacter Zgurskaya et al. 1993
 Rhodoglobus Sheridan et al. 2003
 Rhodoluna Hahn et al. 2014
 Rudaibacter Kim et al. 2013
 Salinibacterium Han et al. 2003
 Schumannella An et al. 2009
 Subtercola Männistö et al. 2000
 Terrimesophilobacter Hahn et al. 2021

Phylogeny
The currently accepted taxonomy is based on the List of Prokaryotic names with Standing in Nomenclature and the phylogeny is based on whole-genome sequences.

Notes

References

Micrococcales
Soil biology